Phyllonorycter iochrysis is a moth of the family Gracillariidae. It is known from Bihar, India.

The larvae feed on Zizyphus jujuba and Zizyphus mauritiana. They probably mine the leaves of their host plant.

References

iochrysis
Moths of Asia
Moths described in 1931